Matt Malloy (born January 12, 1963) is an American actor and producer who has appeared extensively on television, film, and radio. Malloy's break-out performance was his co-starring role alongside Aaron Eckhart and Stacy Edwards in the 1997 black comedy movie In the Company of Men, which he co-executive produced. He also co-starred in the Amazon Prime Video comedy series Alpha House as Mormon GOP Senator Louis Laffer from Nevada.

Early life and education
Malloy was born in the village of Hamilton, New York. He graduated from State University of New York at Purchase. In the 2012 documentary, That Guy... Who Was in That Thing, Malloy stated that his uncle, actor Henry Gibson, inspired him to pursue an acting career.

Career
In 1988, Malloy began his acting career in earnest appearing in the made-for-television movie, The Caine Mutiny Court-Martial, followed by the HBO mockumentary TV series, Tanner '88, as New York City filmmaker, Deke Conners.

In 1989, Malloy appeared in his first box office movie role as the bum Otis in The Unbelievable Truth.

Malloy has since appeared in over 100 television and movie roles and has contributed to voice-over work on radio programs like This American Life aired weekly on the Chicago, Illinois public radio station, WBEZ.

From 2013 to 2014, Malloy starred as Nevada Senator Louis Laffer in Amazon Studios's Alpha House, a political comedy written by Doonesbury creator Garry Trudeau. Along with John Goodman, Malloy played one of four Republican senators living in a house on Capitol Hill.

Personal life 
Malloy is married to director and producer Cas Donovan.

Filmography

Film

Television

Video games

References

External links

Male actors from New York (state)
American male film actors
1963 births
Living people